Eupithecia leucenthesis is a moth in the family Geometridae. It is found in northern Myanmar and Nepal.

Adults are white with scattered markings of warm brown on both the fore- and hindwings.

References

Moths described in 1926
leucenthesis
Moths of Asia